Otera's catalyst, named after Japanese chemist Junzo Otera, is an organostannane compound which has been used as a transesterification catalyst. This isothioscyanate compound is a member of a family of organostannanes reported by Wada and coworkers, and elaborated upon by Otera and coworkers.

Preparation
This class of compounds may be prepared generally by the reaction of an organotin halide and oxide:

 2 R2SnO + 2 R2SnX2 → (XR2SnOSnR2X)2

In particular, the thiocyanate compound was prepared by the reaction of dibutyltin oxide with dibutyltin diisothiocyanate. Otherwise, this compound is not commercially available.

Applications
This thiocyanate compound can be used as a transesterification catalyst. Although it is not well known, it has been used in a number of total syntheses.

In this application, the reaction occurs via the displacement of the bridging isothiocyanate ligands with the incoming alcohol to form an alcohol-bridged active catalyst. Tin acts as the Lewis acid, and gives the transesterified product.

References

Organotin compounds
Catalysts
Thiocyanates
Tin(IV) compounds